Praden (Romansh: Prada) is a village in the municipality of Tschiertschen-Praden in the district of Plessur in the canton of Graubünden in Switzerland.

The formerly independent municipality merged with Tschiertschen to form Tschiertschen-Praden on January 1, 2009.

History
Praden is first mentioned in 1157 as de Pradis.

Geography
Of this area, 26.2% is used for agricultural purposes, while 67.9% is forest. Of the rest of the land, 1.1% is settled (buildings or roads) and the remainder (4.8%) is non-arable (rivers, glaciers or mountains).

The village is located in the Churwalden sub-district of the Plessur district on the mountain slopes above the left side of the Schanfigger valley. In 2009 Praden merged with Tschiertschen to form Tschiertschen-Praden.

Demographics
Praden had a population of 109, of which 8.3% are foreign nationals.  Over the last 10 years the population has decreased at a rate of -14.5%.  Most of the population speaks German (97.0%), with French being second most common ( 1.0%) and Romansh being third ( 1.0%).

, the gender distribution of the population was 48.1% male and 51.9% female.  The age distribution, in Praden is; 11 children or 10.9% of the population are between 0 and 9 years old.  14 teenagers or 13.9% are 10 to 14, and 7 teenagers or 6.9% are 15 to 19.  Of the adult population, 9 people or 8.9% of the population are between 20 and 29 years old.  16 people or 15.8% are 30 to 39, 21 people or 20.8% are 40 to 49, and 14 people or 13.9% are 50 to 59.  The senior population distribution is 4 people or 4.0% of the population are between 60 and 69 years old, 3 people or 3.0% are 70 to 79, there are 2 people or 2.0% who are 80 to 89.

In the 2007 federal election the most popular party was the SP which received 60% of the vote.  The next three most popular parties were the SVP (28.4%), the FDP (10.5%) and the CVP (1.1%).

The entire Swiss population is generally well educated.  In Praden about 89.7% of the population (between age 25-64) have completed either non-mandatory upper secondary education or additional higher education (either University or a Fachhochschule).

Praden has an unemployment rate of 0.96%.  , there were 8 people employed in the primary economic sector and about 4 businesses involved in this sector.  1 person is employed in the secondary sector and there is 1 business in this sector.  14 people are employed in the tertiary sector, with 4 businesses in this sector.

The historical population is given in the following table:

References

External links

 Official website 
 

Tschiertschen-Praden
Former municipalities of Graubünden